Donald James "Don" Johnson (born September 9, 1968) is an American former professional tennis player who reached the World No. 1 doubles ranking in 2002. Although born in Bethlehem, Pennsylvania, he was raised and learned the sport of tennis in the Pittsburgh suburb of Mt. Lebanon, Pennsylvania. Johnson attended Fairview High School in Erie, Pennsylvania, and won the PIAA State Singles Championship in 1984. During his career, he won the Wimbledon men's doubles title in 2001 (partnering Jared Palmer), and the Wimbledon mixed doubles title in 2000 (partnering Kimberly Po). He also won the doubles title at the Tennis Masters Cup in 2000 (partnering Piet Norval). He won a total of 23 top-level doubles titles.

Prior to turning professional, Johnson played collegiate tennis for the University of North Carolina from 1987 to 1991. As a youngster, he earned the Sportsmanship Award at the USTA National Junior Championships in 1986.

Grand Slam finals

Doubles: 1 (1–1)

Mixed doubles: 2 (1–1)

Career finals

Doubles: 35 (23–12)

Doubles performance timeline

References

External links 
 
 
 

1968 births
Living people
American male tennis players
North Carolina Tar Heels men's tennis players
Sportspeople from Mt. Lebanon, Pennsylvania
Tennis people from Pennsylvania
Wimbledon champions
Grand Slam (tennis) champions in mixed doubles
Grand Slam (tennis) champions in men's doubles
ATP number 1 ranked doubles tennis players